Saeed Armaghani (born in 1962) is an Iranian-Hungarian professional basketball coach and former player. 

As a player, Armaghani played as a point guard for MAFC Budapest during the 1988–89 season.

Teams coached
 Iran national basketball team (2001–02) - Head coach
 Kaveh Tehran (2006–08) - Director
 Vasas SC (2008) - Sport director
 Óbudai Kaszások (2018-) - Head Coach (NB1)

Honours
 Ronchetti Cup, 1998

References

Living people
1962 births
Iranian men's basketball players
Iranian basketball coaches
Place of birth missing (living people)
Basketball players at the 1990 Asian Games
Point guards
Asian Games competitors for Iran